The Orville Beach Memorial Manual Training School is located in Oshkosh, Wisconsin.

History
Orville Beach was a local businessman and politician. The school was established in 1912. It was listed on the National Register of Historic Places in 1985 and on the State Register of Historic Places in 1989.

References

School buildings on the National Register of Historic Places in Wisconsin
National Register of Historic Places in Winnebago County, Wisconsin
Schools in Winnebago County, Wisconsin
Buildings and structures in Oshkosh, Wisconsin
Neoclassical architecture in Wisconsin
Stone buildings in the United States
School buildings completed in 1912
1912 establishments in Wisconsin